Olympic Games Tokyo 2020 - The Official Video Game is an Olympic video game developed and published by Sega. The game was originally released in Japan for the Nintendo Switch and PlayStation 4 on July 24, 2019. However, due to the COVID-19 pandemic delaying the start of the 2020 Summer Olympics in Tokyo, the game was not released outside of Japan until June 2021, when it also released for Microsoft Windows, Stadia, and Xbox One.

The game features 80 national teams and 18 events. Players can make their own players, have and play against fictional players in any mode, or licensed players by playing vs top athlete in training mode.

Disciplines
The following events are in the game: four additional sports were added to the game as free post launch updates.

: Later added as downloadable content.

Playable nations

Reception

The Switch version received 80% from Digitally Downloaded, who said that "one of the areas that Tokyo 2020 immediately stands out is that it has a good range of different sports represented, and they all play differently." They went on to praise the presentation and the customisation, adding that "as a single player game it's a little lonely and limited."

References

External links
Official website

2020 Summer Olympics
2019 video games
Association football video games
Baseball video games
Basketball video games
Beach volleyball video games
Boxing video games
Cycling video games
Impact of the COVID-19 pandemic on the video game industry
Judo video games
Multiplayer and single-player video games
Multiple-sport video games
Nintendo Switch games
Summer Olympic video games
PlayStation 4 games
Sega video games
Sports video games set in Japan
Stadia games
Table tennis video games
Tennis video games
Video games set in 2021
Video games set in Tokyo
Volleyball video games
Water sports video games
Windows games
Xbox One games
Video games scored by Jun Senoue
Video games scored by Kenichi Tokoi
Video games scored by Tomonori Sawada
Video games developed in Japan